Bressan may refer to:

People with the name Bressan
 Peter Bressan (1663–1731), a noted French woodwind instrument maker 
 Luigi Bressan (born  1940), an Italian prelate of the Catholic Church
 Arthur J. Bressan Jr. (1943–1987), an American filmmaker
 Alberto Bressan (born 1956), an Italian mathematician at Penn State
 Filippo Maria Bressan (born 1957), an Italian conductor
 Roberto Bressan (born 1960), an Italian former professional racing cyclist
 Mauro Bressan (born 1971), a retired Italian footballer
 Walter Bressan (born 1981), a former Italian professional footballer
 Matheus Simonete Bressaneli (born 1993), a Brazilian footballer commonly known as Bressan
 Juliet Bressan, an Irish novelist and doctor

Other uses
 a dialect of the Franco-Provençal language